The Microsoft campus is the corporate headquarters of Microsoft, located in Redmond, Washington, United States, a part of the Seattle metropolitan area. Microsoft initially moved onto the grounds of the campus on February 26, 1986, shortly before going public on March 13.

Additional offices in the Eastside suburbs of Seattle are located in Bellevue and Issaquah. Building 92 on the campus contains a visitor center (with interactive exhibits) and store that are open to the public.

History

Microsoft chose to move its headquarters from Bellevue to nearby Redmond in January 1985, selecting a  plot of land that would be developed by Wright Runstad & Company. Construction began on August 9, and Microsoft moved into the $25 million facility on February 26, 1986, several weeks before the company's initial public offering. The move generated some concerns about increased traffic congestion on the unfinished State Route 520 freeway between Bellevue and Redmond; a new freeway interchange at Northeast 40th Street would later be built in 2000 to service the campus, after lobbying and partial funding from Microsoft.

The initial campus was situated on a  lot with six buildings and was able to accommodate 800 employees, growing to 1,400 by 1988. The site was once home to chicken farms in the 1920s that were ultimately demolished. The campus was originally leased to Microsoft from the Teachers Insurance and Annuity Association, a pension fund manager, until it was bought back in 1992. The original buildings were given sequential numbers, with the exception of 7 due to a delay in permitting that became indefinite. A pond between the original buildings was nicknamed "Lake Bill" for Bill Gates and was used for post-project celebrations, namely managers being thrown in after a successful launch.

Microsoft also announced its intention to contain most of its future growth within Redmond, while retaining some offices in Downtown Bellevue and its Factoria district. The Redmond campus was plagued by hundreds of rabbits who spread around the area in the late 1990s.

In January 2006, Microsoft announced the purchase of Safeco's Redmond campus after the company had begun consolidating its offices at the Safeco Tower in Seattle's University District a year earlier. The campus expansion also included more prominent branding and additional recreation areas.

In 2009, a shopping mall called "The Commons" was completed on the campus, bringing  of retail space as well as restaurants, a soccer field and a pub, to the West Campus.

Latest expansion

In September 2015, The Seattle Times reported that Microsoft had hired architecture firm Skidmore, Owings & Merrill to begin a multibillion-dollar redesign of the Redmond campus, using an additional  permitted by an agreement with the City of Redmond. The City of Redmond had also approved a rezone in February that year to raise the height limit for buildings on the campus from six stories to ten.

In November 2017, Microsoft announced plans to demolish 12 buildings on the older East Campus and replace them with 18 new buildings, adding  to house 8,000 additional employees. The newer buildings would be arranged like an urban neighborhood, centered around a  open space with sports fields (including a cricket pitch), retail space, and hiking trails. The program is planned to raise the total number of buildings on the campus to 131. A digital recreation of the future campus was made available in Minecraft Education Edition in November 2018. Demolition of the original buildings, including all of the original X-shaped offices built in the 1980s, began in January 2019 and was completed that September.

The expanded campus, scheduled to open in 2023, will have 17 office buildings and four floors of underground parking with capacity for 6,500 vehicles. A  pedestrian bridge will connect the new campus buildings to the Redmond Technology light rail station and the West Campus site. A set of 875 wells to harness geothermal energy will provide heating and cooling to buildings on the campus through  of water pipes that comprise a geoexchange system.

Description

The company has a total of 125 buildings in the Puget Sound region and employs 53,576 people.

Transportation

The campus is located on both sides of the State Route 520 freeway, which connects it to the cities of Bellevue and Seattle as well as Redmond city center. Microsoft partially covered the cost for an overpass over the freeway at NE 36th Street to relieve congestion on other cross-streets in the area.

The campus is served by buses to Seattle and other Eastside cities at the Overlake Transit Center, operated by Sound Transit and King County Metro. The RapidRide B Line also runs through the campus, connecting to downtown Bellevue and Redmond. The transit center opened in 2002 and will be the eastern terminus of the East Link light rail extension, scheduled to open in 2023. Microsoft partnered with Sound Transit and the City of Redmond to fund a pedestrian bridge connecting the light rail station to both sides of its campus planned to open in 2020, providing $33.3 million of the cost. 

For employees, Microsoft also operates a commuter bus service called "The Connector" that provides non-stop service from the Redmond campus to neighborhoods in Seattle, the Eastside, and Snohomish County. The shuttles, which began operating in 2007, were targeted in early 2014 as a symbol of gentrification in similar fashion to the San Francisco tech bus protests that same year. The company also runs a shuttle bus service, called the "Shuttle Connect", between buildings on the campus.

References

External links

 Facts About Microsoft
 Campus map

Microsoft
Information technology company headquarters in the United States
Buildings and structures in Redmond, Washington
Office buildings completed in 1986
1986 establishments in Washington (state)
Office buildings in Washington (state)